Camarines Sur's 4th congressional district is one of the five congressional districts of the Philippines in the province of Camarines Sur. It has been represented in the House of Representatives since 1987. The district consists of municipalities in the Partido region of eastern Camarines Sur, namely Caramoan, Garchitorena, Goa, Lagonoy, Presentacion, Sagñay, San Jose, Siruma, Tigaon and Tinambac. It is currently represented in the 18th Congress by Arnulf Bryan Fuentebella of the Nationalist People's Coalition (NPC).

Representation history

Election results

2022

2019

2016

2013

2010

See also
Legislative districts of Camarines Sur

References

Congressional districts of the Philippines
Politics of Camarines Sur
1987 establishments in the Philippines
Congressional districts of the Bicol Region
Constituencies established in 1987